is a Japanese romance manga series written and illustrated by Ako Shimaki. It is published by Shogakukan in Cheese!. It was adapted into a Japanese television drama series in 2013.

Characters
 Kyōnosuke Kawamura (Yūta Tamamori)
 Ichiya Sawayama (Yūma Nakayama)
 Ayame Chiba (Umika Kawashima)

Reception
It won the Shogakukan Manga Award for shōjo manga in 2011 and it was number eight on the 2012 Kono Manga ga Sugoi! Top 20 Manga for Female Readers survey.

Volume 7 reached the 29th place on the Japanese weekly manga chart and, as of 1 July 2012, has sold 35,767 copies. Volume 9 reached the 50th place and, as of 27 April 2013, has sold 24,319 copies. Volume 10 reached the 21st place and, as of 4 August 2013, has sold 67,825 copies. Volume 11 reached the 18th place and, as of 2 February 2014, has sold 62,372 copies. Volume 12 reached the 24th place, and, as of 6 July 2014, has sold 55,031 copies.

References

External links
Pin to Kona on TBS 

2013 Japanese television series debuts
2013 Japanese television series endings
Japanese romance television series
Romance anime and manga
Shogakukan franchises
Shogakukan manga
Shōjo manga
TBS Television (Japan) dramas
Winners of the Shogakukan Manga Award for shōjo manga